Hubert Beuve-Méry (5 January 1902 in Paris – 6 August 1989 in Fontainebleau) was a French journalist and newspaper editor. Before the Second World War, he was associated with the Vichy regime until December 1942, when he joined the Resistance. In 1944, he founded Le Monde at the behest of Charles de Gaulle. Following the liberation of France, Beuve-Méry built Le Monde from the ruins of Le Temps by using its offices, printing presses, masthead and those staff members who had not collaborated with the Germans.

Biography 
He retired his editorship in 1969 but retained an office at the Le Monde building, until his death at age 87 at his home in Fontainebleau, near Paris.

In 2000, he was named a World Press Freedom Hero by the Vienna-based International Press Institute.

References 

1902 births
1989 deaths
French newspaper editors
20th-century French journalists
Writers from Paris
French male non-fiction writers
French Resistance members
Burials at Montparnasse Cemetery
French newspaper founders
20th-century French male writers